Adair Village is a city in Benton County, Oregon, United States. The population was 840 at the 2010 census.

History
Adair Village was named after the World War II military installation Camp Adair. When the war ended, the camp was closed and most of the buildings removed, except for the hospital, which in 1946 was leased to Oregon State University for student and faculty housing. The university converted the hospital into apartments, a local government was organized, and Adair Village post office established in 1947.

When the postwar enrollment boom dwindled, Oregon State gave up its lease, and the United States Air Force maintained the base as a radar station. Adair Village post office closed in 1951, and Adair Air Force Station post office took its place from 1961 through 1969. The Air Force ceased operations and sold the property, with the individual houses being placed on the market. Adair Village incorporated in 1976. Adair Village city hall is one of the original World War II buildings.

Geography

Demographics

The city is part of the Corvallis, Oregon, Metropolitan Statistical Area.

2010 census

As of the census of 2010, there were 840 people, 279 households, and 227 families residing in the city. The racial makeup of the city was 88.5% White, 1.2% African American, 1.4% Native American, 1.9% Asian, 0.2% Pacific Islander, 0.8% from other races, and 6.0% from two or more races. Hispanic or Latino of any race were 6.7% of the population.

There were 279 households, of which 57.0% had children under the age of 18 living with them, 57.7% were married couples living together, 19.7% had a female householder with no husband present, 3.9% had a male householder with no wife present, and 18.6% were non-families. 12.9% of all households were made up of individuals, and 1.1% had someone living alone who was 65 years of age or older. The average household size was 3.01 and the average family size was 3.30.

The median age in the city was 30.6 years. 36.7% of residents were under the age of 18; 5.8% were between the ages of 18 and 24; 34% were from 25 to 44; 20% were from 45 to 64; and 3.6% were 65 years of age or older. The gender makeup of the city was 48.6% male and 51.4% female.

2000 census
As of the census of 2000, there were 536 people, 170 households, and 140 families residing in the city. The population density was 2,250.3 people per square mile (862.3/km). There were 180 housing units at an average density of 755.7 per square mile (289.6/km). The racial makeup of the city was 87.87% White, 0.75% African American, 2.43% Native American, 1.31% Asian, 1.49% Pacific Islander, 1.12% from other races, and 5.04% from two or more races. Hispanic or Latino of any race were 4.48% of the population.

There were 170 households, out of which 52.4% had children under the age of 18 living with them, 64.1% were married couples living together, 12.9% had a female householder with no husband present, and 17.1% were non-families. 11.2% of all households were made up of individuals, and 2.4% had someone living alone who was 65 years of age or older. The average household size was 3.15 and the average family size was 3.40.

In the city, the population was spread out, with 35.4% under the age of 18, 9.5% from 18 to 24, 32.8% from 25 to 44, 19.0% from 45 to 64, and 3.2% who were 65 years of age or older. The median age was 28 years. For every 100 females, there were 98.5 males. For every 100 females age 18 and over, there were 87.0 males.

The median income for a household in the city was $49,000, and the median income for a family was $51,667. Males had a median income of $38,750 versus $29,286 for females. The per capita income for the city was $16,311. About 6.4% of families and 9.0% of the population were below the poverty line, including 9.8% of those under age 18 and none of those age 65 or over.

Sites of interest
The Oregon Department of Fish and Wildlife-administered E. E. Wilson Wildlife Area forms the northern border of the city.

See also
Santiam Christian School

References

External links

Entry for Adair Village in the Oregon Blue Book

1947 establishments in Oregon
Cities in Benton County, Oregon
Cities in Oregon
Populated places established in 1947